The  is an electric multiple unit (EMU) train type operated by the private railway operator Seibu Railway on commuter services in the Tokyo area of Japan from 1978 to 1997.

Seibu Railway

1st 401 Series was constructed in 1968. Then known as 411 Series. At the time before conversion. 411 Series cars had the MT15E Traction Motors, in later years Seibu converted all 411 Series cars to Seibu 401 Series. MT15E Traction Motors were replaced with MT46-based Hitachi Resistor Controlled motors. Last remaining trains were withdrawn in 1997.

Sangi Railway

401 Series train sets were transferred to Sangi Railway in 1990. Among other Seibu EMUs sent to that railway, it's the only 2-car EMU Series on Sangi Railway line.

Ohmi Railway
 Ohmi 800/820 Series - Entered Service in 1997 (820 Series) And 1998 (800 Series)
 Ohmi 700 Series - Entered Service On June 13, 1998, Withdrawn On May 6th 2019.

Ohmi Railway 700 And 800 Series are the converted Seibu 401 Series after conversion with the change of the cabins. 2 Cars Of 820 Series have the remarks of original 401 Series prior to conversion

Electric multiple units of Japan
411 series

1500 V DC multiple units of Japan